Mark Proksch (born ) is an American comedian and character actor. He is best known for acting in the television series The Office, Better Call Saul, Dream Corp LLC, What We Do in the Shadows and as a fictionalized version of himself in the On Cinema universe.

He rose to prominence when he portrayed the character "K-Strass," a parody of a yo-yo master, who appeared on local news shows.

Early life
Proksch grew up in Onalaska, Wisconsin, and is a graduate of Onalaska High School and the University of Wisconsin–Eau Claire.

K-Strass
Proksch had the alias of Kenny "K-Strass" Strasser early in his career, during which he appeared on small-market local newscasts as a hapless "yo-yo master." In these appearances, he fabricated stories about visiting schools to speak to children about environmentalism. When asked to perform tricks live on the air, he would display a complete inability to do any of them. The character of K-Strass was described by online magazine Paste as "the funniest thing that's ever happened" and speaking "in a nasal Midwestern accent, with a halting cadence that was both awkward and deliberate." K-Strass was created when Proksch's temp job at an ad agency fell through.

Proksch also appeared as K-Strass while opening for Gregg Turkington's Neil Hamburger on tour. Turkington and Proksch would work together again on On Cinema.

Television career
Proksch had a recurring role on the television series The Office as Nate, Dwight Schrute's lackey and the office handyman. He appeared in 19 episodes over the show's final three seasons. In March 2013, Proksch starred in the NBC television pilot Holding Patterns. He also voiced the character Johnnie in the Adventure Time episode "Bad Timing." In March 2014, Proksch appeared in an episode of Portlandia as Carrie Brownstein's love interest.  From 2015 to 2017 he appeared as Daniel "Pryce" Wormald, a recurring character on the AMC drama series Better Call Saul, a prequel to Breaking Bad.  From 2014 through 2020, Proksch appeared as the character "Randy Blink" in the Adult Swim series Dream Corp LLC. In 2015, Proksch appeared in Season 3, Episode 1 of Drunk History in which he told the story of the Bone Wars.

On Cinema at the Cinema
Proksch plays a fictionalized version of himself in the On Cinema universe, in which he attempts various impersonations, including W.C. Fields and The Marx Brothers. The fictional Proksch was briefly declared dead during the 5th Annual On Cinema Oscar special, having suffocated inside a heavy diving suit during a Jaws impersonation skit. His character briefly appears in season 10's VR episodes, when the camera is turned showing his comatose body. This takes place during a recurring section in which Gregg Turkington plays his old audition tapes for films he failed to be cast in. His comatose body again appears in the 6th Annual Oscar special as "The Living Oscar". Painted gold and strapped to a gurney, pre-recorded phrases in his voice are played in answer to questions surrounding Oscar trivia. During one segment his comatose body is slowly rotated around a compilation of past Oscar nominated films. He awakens after being knocked over by host Tim Heidecker and spends the rest of the special in a state of confusion and shock while bleeding from a broken nose. The fictional Proksch still appeared confused in the next season of On Cinema. After being beaten in a Los Angeles Police Department holding cell when he was wrongly arrested for selling VHS copies of public domain movies with Gregg, he goes missing. During the 8th Annual Oscar special, a brief video recording that appears to depict the fictional Proksch surfaces and suggests that he no longer wishes to be involved with the hosts of On Cinema. He later returns to co-star as The Mummy and other characters, in Deck of Cards.

What We Do in the Shadows
Proksch starred as Colin Robinson, an energy vampire, in the first three seasons of the FX series What We Do in the Shadows, before portraying the reincarnation of Colin Robinson as a child and teenager nicknamed ("The Boy") following the original Colin's death in the third season finale.

Filmography

Film

Television

Web  series

Nomination

References

External links

Living people
Male actors from Wisconsin
American male comedians
21st-century American comedians
University of Wisconsin–Eau Claire alumni
American male television actors
21st-century American male actors
Comedians from Wisconsin
Year of birth missing (living people)